The Treaty of Canterbury was a diplomatic agreement concluded between Sigismund, Holy Roman Emperor, and King Henry V of England on 15 August 1416. The treaty resulted in a defensive and offensive alliance against France.

Precipitating events
Sigismund began to shift his alliance from France to England after the French defeat at the Battle of Agincourt. After departing from the Council of Constance, Sigismund arrived in Paris on 1 March 1416. He was unable to reach an agreement with the French government because Bernard d'Armagnac wanted to maintain his naval blockade of Harfleur and prevent the English from maintaining a naval base in Normandy. In addition, Sigismund could not create an agreement that satisfied both the opposing Orleanist and Burgundian factions of the government.

As a result of his struggles in creating an agreement, Sigismund traveled to London on 3 May 1416 to negotiate with Henry V of England. Upon his arrival, Sigismund was made a Knight of the Garter, viewed a session of parliament and was gifted a golden necklace that was created by Hermann Ruissel and featured white enamel bears, one of Henry's heraldic devices. However, Sigismund still wanted a peace settlement and continued negotiating with France as well. In July 1416, Sigismund convinced Henry V and the French government to hold a conference in Paris between Charles VI of France, Sigismund and Henry V to discuss a possible peace treaty.

However, Bernard of Armagnac, having lost the Battle of Valmont, convinced Charles VI and the French government to reject the embassy because he believed that it was just a scheme that would result in the English gaining the territory of Harfleur. Angered by the rejection, Sigismund resorted to creating the Treaty of Canterbury with only England on the grounds that France favoured the schism and opposed any peace agreement with England.

Motivations
Sigismund wanted to unify the Catholic Church and end the Papal schism. However, he believed that the tensions between the English and the French served as a major obstacle to accomplishing unification. In addition, Sigismund desired to create a united Europe to fight in a crusade against the Ottoman Empire.

Terms of the treaty
The treaty was signed on 15 August 1416. Henry V and Sigismund pledged to each other that they would provide support to gain back any territories held by the French. The subjects of both rulers were given the ability to trade and move among each other's lands freely. They agreed that neither side would harbor traitors or rebels of the other but would aid each other during an invasion.

Outcome
The Treaty of Canterbury, by favoring England and denouncing France, effectively ended the friendship between the house of Luxembourg and France, which Sigismund's grandfather, John of Bohemia, had established. However, before the end of Henry V's reign, the policies established by the Treaty of Canterbury had been abandoned because Sigismund became more involved in the Council of Constance and his control over Bohemian territory and less concerned with Anglo-French politics. All of those distractions meant that Sigismund was never able to create any military support and that the true intent of the treaty was not fulfilled.

References

External links 
 B. Guenee. Between Church and State: The Lives of Four French Prelates in the Late Middle Ages

1416 in England
History of Canterbury
1410s in the Holy Roman Empire
Treaties of medieval England
Canterbury
Canterbury
England–France relations
England–Holy Roman Empire relations
Sigismund, Holy Roman Emperor
Henry V of England